The 2016–17 Washington State Cougars women's basketball team represented Washington State University during the 2016–17 NCAA Division I women's basketball season. The Cougars, led by tenth year head coach June Daugherty, play their home games at the Beasley Coliseum and are members of the Pac-12 Conference. They finished the season 16–20, 6–12 in the Pac-12 to finish in a tie for seventh place. They advanced to the quarterfinals of the Pac-12 women's tournament where they lost to Stanford. They were invited to the Women's National Invitation Tournament where they defeated BYU, Wyoming and UC Davis in the first, second and third rounds, Iowa in the quarterfinals before losing to Georgia Tech in the semifinals.

Roster

Schedule

|-
!colspan=9 style="background:#981E32; color:#FFFFFF;"| Exhibition

|-
!colspan=9 style="background:#981E32; color:#FFFFFF;"| Non-conference regular season

|-
!colspan=9 style="background:#981E32; color:#FFFFFF;"| Pac-12 regular season

|-
!colspan=9 style="background:#981E32;"| Pac-12 Women's Tournament

|-
!colspan=9 style="text-align: center; background:#981E32"|WNIT

Rankings

See also
 2016–17 Washington State Cougars men's basketball team

References

Washington State Cougars women's basketball seasons
Washington State
Washington State
Washington State
2017 Women's National Invitation Tournament participants